Larry Alphonso Johnson Jr. (born November 19, 1979) is a former American football National Football League (NFL) running back. He played college football for Penn State University, and was a unanimous All-American. He was drafted by the Kansas City Chiefs in the first round of the 2003 NFL Draft, and also played for the Cincinnati Bengals, Washington Redskins, and Miami Dolphins.

Early years
Johnson was born in Pomfret, Maryland. He was one of three children born to Christine and Larry Johnson Sr. His father is a former high school vice-principal, a high school football coach, former defensive line coach at Penn State University, and the current defensive line coach at Ohio State University. Johnson graduated from State College Area High School in State College, Pennsylvania, where he played for the State College Little Lions high school football team.

College career
Johnson attended Pennsylvania State University, and played for coach Joe Paterno's Penn State Nittany Lions football team from 1999 to 2002. As a senior in 2002, he rushed for over 2,000 yards in a season without winning the Heisman Trophy, despite doing so with fewer carries than any other running back in the 2,000-yard club (this record was broken on November 22, 2014 by Wisconsin's Melvin Gordon, who gained 2,000 yards on 241 carries—10 fewer than Johnson's 251). He averaged 8.0 yards per carry during the regular season. Johnson broke the Penn State record for rushing yards in a game three times in 2002. His 257 yards in a 49–0 home thrashing of Northwestern broke Curt Warner's previous record of 256 yards set against Syracuse in 1981. He then went on to rack up 279 yards in an 18–7 home win against Illinois and 327 yards in a 58–25 road win against Indiana. He surpassed the 2,000-yard mark by gaining 279 yards on just 19 attempts in the Penn State Nittany Lions' final Big Ten Conference game against Michigan State. Johnson gained all 279 of his rushing yards in the first half, and was kept on the bench for the entire second half of the game. He finished the 2002 season with 2,087 yards.

Following his 2002 senior season, Johnson was a first-team All-Big Ten selection and a unanimous first-team All-American. He also won the Doak Walker Award (top running back), the Maxwell Award (top college player), and the Walter Camp Award (top college player). Johnson rushed for 2,159 yards and 29 touchdowns.
He earned a Bachelor of Arts degree in integrative arts from Penn State in 2002.

College statistics

Professional career

Kansas City Chiefs

2003-06
Johnson was drafted in the first round with the 27th overall pick in the 2003 NFL Draft as insurance for the Kansas City Chiefs, who were unsure if Priest Holmes would be healthy or even sign a contract extension. Johnson was drafted over the objection of head coach Dick Vermeil, who wanted to select a defensive player, and despite the lack of recent NFL success by Penn State running backs (Blair Thomas, Ki-Jana Carter, and Curtis Enis). Vermeil criticized Johnson for his casual approach toward preparation. The conflicts between Johnson and Vermeil grew, and in 2004 Vermeil said that Johnson needed to grow up and "take the diapers off."

Johnson took great offense to this comment, and the public estrangement led to rumors that he would be traded. However, towards the end of the 2004 season, Johnson got an opportunity to start after injuries to Priest Holmes and Derrick Blaylock.

Facing the same situation in 2005, with Blaylock gone and Holmes having gone down with a season-ending neck injury in early November, Johnson on November 20 against the Houston Texans ran for a Chiefs' record 211 rushing yards and two touchdowns. He led the league in rushing yards and touchdowns after the injury to Holmes.

At the end of the 2005 regular season, Johnson had nine consecutive games with 100+ rushing yards, passing the 100-yard mark in every start for the Chiefs that season and earning a Pro Bowl berth. During the final game of the 2005 regular season, Johnson set a new franchise record of 1,750 rushing yards in one season, despite not starting in 7 games during the season. In addition Johnson caught 33 passes for 343 yards, averaging over 10 yards per reception. Johnson was named the 2005 MVP for the Chiefs. The Chiefs' record in 2005 was 10–6, but it did not make the playoffs in spite of a winning record.

With injuries limiting Holmes during the previous two seasons, Johnson began the 2006 season as Kansas City's featured back. He rushed for 1,789 yards (second in the league) on 416 carries, an NFL record for most carries in a season. The Chiefs made an appearance in the playoffs with a 9–7 record, where Johnson ran for 32 yards on 13 carries against the Indianapolis Colts. At the conclusion of the season, Johnson was selected for his second Pro Bowl appearance.

2007-09
On June 21, 2007, Johnson stated that he was willing to sit out the Chiefs' training camp unless he and the Chiefs reached an agreement on a new contract. On July 22, rumors spread about Johnson being traded to the Green Bay Packers. The initial asking price was a first-, second-, and third-round draft pick. Starting on July 27 with the beginning of training camp, he began a holdout during which he was fined $14,000 per day by the team, and did not report to training camp until nearly a month later when he and the team agreed to a five-year contract extension that locked Johnson up with the Chiefs through the 2012 season. As a result of the extension, Johnson was the highest-paid running back in the NFL based on average salary per year. His new contract covered six years and was to pay him $45 million, with $19 million in guaranteed money—the biggest contract in Chiefs history.

In week 9 of the 2007 regular season, Johnson was sidelined late in the 4th quarter against the Green Bay Packers with a foot injury. The injury was season-ending; Johnson did not see any playing time in the rest of the 2007 season, and was placed on the injured reserve list. Johnson ended the season with 559 yards on 158 attempts, and only three rushing touchdowns.

In Johnson's first regular season game since his injury, he rushed for 74 yards on 22 carries with an average of 3.4 yards per carry against the New England Patriots on September 7, 2008. The Chiefs lost the game 17–10. After a loss to the Oakland Raiders the following week, Johnson spoke out about his low number of carries. In his next two games, Johnson rushed for a combined 319 yards on 52 attempts with an average of 6.1 yards per carry.

Johnson was suspended for the Chiefs' game against the Tennessee Titans on October 18 for violating team rules. Johnson also was benched for the following game against the New York Jets. Johnson, after weeks of being inactive for the Chiefs, was suspended by league commissioner Roger Goodell for the team's week 10 game against the San Diego Chargers, for violating the league's personal conduct policy, after he was charged with simple assault for allegedly spitting his drink in a woman's face (the fourth time in five years he had been accused of assaulting a woman), and as he awaited a court date for allegedly pushing another woman's face. The suspension cost him $147,000; one game check. He finished the season with 874 yards and five touchdowns.

Johnson's 2009 season got off to a very slow start, despite Johnson keeping his starting job. As of week 8, he had 132 attempts for only 358 yards. His 2.7 yards per carry were the worst of any NFL running back with at least 70 carries.

On October 27, 2009, the Chiefs "instructed Larry to refrain from practicing with the Chiefs or participating in other team activities" for his Twitter comments on Chiefs' head coach Todd Haley and reportedly using gay slurs when he addressed the media. Because of his comments, Johnson encountered backlash from the Gay & Lesbian Alliance Against Defamation. Johnson's Twitter comments were: "My father got more credentials than most of these pro coaches." That was followed by: "My father played for the coach from "remember the titans". Our coach played golf. My father played for redskins briefley. Our coach. Nuthn." Johnson's tweets were responded to by fans, one tweet including a reference to his nightclub incident. Johnson's response used the word "fag". The final post read: "Make me regret it. Lmao. U don't stop my checks. Lmao. So 'tweet' away." Johnson subsequently said about the incidents, "First of all, I want to apologize to the fans of the Kansas City Chiefs and the rest of the NFL, Commissioner Goodell, the Chiefs organization, Coach Todd Haley, his staff, and my teammates for the words I used yesterday. I regret my actions. The words were used by me in frustration, and they were not appropriate."

On October 28, 2009, the Chiefs suspended Johnson until November 9 for "conduct detrimental to the club". They ultimately agreed to a deal with his agent, Peter Schaffer, in which he would only lose one game check ($300,000). At the time of the suspension, Johnson was only 75 yards from passing Priest Holmes as the franchise's all-time leading rusher. This angered several fans, who started a petition demanding that the Chiefs either deactivate, release, or waive him. The petition said that Johnson "has never represented anything close to the values that we have for our Chiefs" and thus did not deserve the record.

On November 9, the day Johnson was due to return from his suspension, the Chiefs waived him. Reportedly, the final straw for Chiefs general manager Scott Pioli was yet another tweet in which Johnson belittled a fan for making less money than he made. Johnson's agent, Schaffer, issued the following statement: "A part of him is excited and a part of him is very regretful. There's a lot of feelings going on right now. It's analogous to breaking up with a girlfriend. Maybe you saw it coming, but it still hurts when it happens."

Cincinnati Bengals
In November 2009, Johnson signed with the Cincinnati Bengals for the prorated league minimum pay. Johnson served as backup to starting running back Cedric Benson. In the Bengals week 12 win over the Browns, Johnson rushed for 107 yards, his only 100-yard game of the season.

Washington Redskins
Johnson signed a three-year contract worth up to $12 million with the Washington Redskins as an unrestricted free agent on March 12, 2010. He played for former Denver Broncos coach Mike Shanahan. On September 21, 2010, Johnson was released by the Redskins.

Miami Dolphins
On August 23, 2011, Johnson signed with the Miami Dolphins. On September 3, the Dolphins terminated Johnson's contract during final roster cuts. He rushed for 46 yards and one touchdown on 12 carries in the 2011 preseason. However, he was re-signed on September 8 after an injury to Daniel Thomas. He was released following the Dolphins' week 2 loss to the Houston Texans, when he ran the ball only once for a two-yard gain.

NFL career statistics

Regular season

Playoffs

NFL records
 Most rushing attempts in a single season: 416 (2006)

Chiefs franchise records
 Most career rushing attempts (1,375)
 Most rushing yards in a single season: 1,789 (2006)

Personal life
Johnson and his father, Larry Sr., maintain a close relationship. Johnson's brother and manager, Tony Johnson, is a former starting wide receiver for Penn State from 2000–2003.

Johnson appeared on the cover of the PlayStation 2 game NCAA Gamebreaker 2004 in a Penn State uniform. In 2007, Johnson appeared in Fantasia's music video for the song "When I See U". Johnson also made an appearance in Jay-Z's music video "Roc Boys (And the Winner Is)...". In October 2013, TMZ reported that Johnson had been a recurring guest DJ at Miami strip club Tootsie's Cabaret.

Because of memory loss, suicidal impulses, mood swings, and headaches, Johnson believes he has chronic traumatic encephalopathy (which can't be diagnosed until an autopsy is performed on the brain after death). Johnson also states that he does not remember playing two seasons. His method of dealing with the trauma is to control his social interactions and spend quality time with his daughter.

Controversies
Since 2020, Johnson has been criticized for posts on his Twitter account including antisemitic comments such as claiming Jews worship Satan, and attributing fake quotes to the Bible. CNN reporter Jake Tapper called his comments explicitly "antisemitic garbage", due to references to a "jewish cabal" and posting alleged quotes regarding "jews toy(ing) with the public as a cat toys with a mouse" or worshipping [satan]." Johnson's tweets have also touched on topics common among conspiracy theory proponents, including freemasonry. He frequently tweets conspiracy theories about celebrity deaths, including the death of Kobe Bryant, which he claimed that LeBron James made a "blood sacrifice" to kill Bryant in exchange for the Los Angeles Lakers winning the 2020 NBA Finals. He also claims Tom Brady and other NFL players are part of the occult, and that the NFL rigs and scripts games.

Legal troubles
Johnson has been arrested at least six times since 2003.  Five of his arrests were on various assault charges against women, four while he was an active player in the NFL.

In December 2003, he was arrested for felony aggravated assault and misdemeanor domestic battery for slapping and waving a gun at his then-girlfriend as he threatened her, during an argument at his home. The charges were dropped after Johnson agreed to participate in a domestic violence diversion program. He was required to complete 120 hours of community service, attend an anger management course, and stay out of trouble for two years.

In September 2005, Johnson was again arrested for assault when a 25-year-old woman accused Johnson of pushing her to the ground in a Kansas City bar. Johnson turned himself in and was cited for domestic abuse assault; he posted bond and was released. But the case was dropped after the alleged victim failed to appear in court for three hearings.

His third arrest for assault came in February 2008, after he allegedly shoved a 26-year-old woman's head at a Kansas City nightclub.

In October 2008, Johnson was arrested for the fourth time and charged with one count of non-aggravated assault for allegedly spitting a drink in a 24-year-old woman's face and threatening to kill her boyfriend at a Kansas City nightclub on October 11. The woman filed a civil suit against Johnson, accusing him of negligence, assault and battery, intentional infliction of emotional distress, and negligent infliction of emotional distress.

Johnson was deactivated for the October 19, 2008 game against the Tennessee Titans for violating an undisclosed team rule. The team said his suspension for the game was unrelated to the criminal investigation.

In March 2009, Johnson pleaded guilty to two counts of disturbing the peace, regarding the two incidents in 2008, and was sentenced to two years' probation. In July 2010 a judge admonished him in court for failing to perform his full community service, said he "puts people in jail every day for not doing community service," but chose not to do so and instead reinstated Johnson's probation. The City Prosecutor said he was supposed to send a monthly form to his probation officer, but failed to, and also failed to report to his probation officer that he had been stopped by police in Virginia and cited for not having a driver's license. After the 20-minute hearing, Johnson walked out of the courtroom smiling.

On October 5, 2012, Johnson was again arrested, in Las Vegas for domestic violence charges that included beating and strangulation of a former girlfriend at the Bellagio resort Las Vegas Strip hotel and casino. The 32-year-old woman was said to have had several injuries to her face, bruising on her neck, and been choked into unconsciousness. Johnson pretended to run from hotel security officers, and told one security officer he would rip his vocal cords out. He was booked into the Clark County Detention Center with bond set at $15,000, and was released after spending 18 hours behind bars. He faced a maximum five years in jail, and a $15,000 fine. However, a felony charge was dropped as part of a plea deal, and he was ruled guilty of misdemeanor domestic violence battery and assault, and sentenced to one year of probation and ordered to pay a $345 fine, perform 48 hours of community service, and attend six months of counseling.

On October 7, 2014, Johnson was arrested for the sixth time after punching a 29-year-old man in a Miami Beach club, and allegedly cutting him with a broken bottle. He was charged with aggravated battery and booked into the Miami-Dade County jail with bond set at $7,500. Johnson later pleaded guilty to battery and was sentenced to 12 months' probation, 60 hours of community service, and must submit to substance abuse evaluations, and stay away from the victim and the club.

See also
List of NCAA major college football yearly rushing leaders

References

Further reading

External links

 Yahoo! Sports

1979 births
Living people
African-American players of American football
All-American college football players
American Conference Pro Bowl players
American football running backs
American people convicted of assault
Cincinnati Bengals players
Kansas City Chiefs players
Maxwell Award winners
Miami Dolphins players
Penn State Nittany Lions football players
People from Charles County, Maryland
People from State College, Pennsylvania
Players of American football from Maryland
Players of American football from Pennsylvania
Sportspeople from the Washington metropolitan area
Washington Redskins players